Listed below are the UCI Women's Teams and riders that competed in 2006 women's road cycling events organized by the International Cycling Union (UCI) including the 2005 UCI Women's Road World Cup.

Teams overview

Cyclists

@Work Cycling Team

Ages as of 1 January 2005.

A.S. Team F.R.W

Arbö Askö Graz

Bizkaia–Panda Software–Durango

Buitenpoort–Flexpoint Team

Elk Haus-tirol Noe

Equipe Nürnberger Versicherung

Nobili Rubinetterie-menikini Cogeas

Ages as of 1 January 2005.

P.M.B. Fenixs

Ages as of 1 January 2005.
 
2005

S.C. Michela Fanini Record Rox

Safi–Pasta Zara Manhattan

SS Lazio Ciclismo Team Ladispoli

Ages as of 1 January 2005.

Team Bianchi-Aliverti

Team Bigla

Team Next 125

Ages as of 1 January 2005.

Team Pruneaux d'Agen

Team S.A.T.S

Ages as of 1 January 2005.

Team T-Mobile Women

Ages as of 1 January 2005.

Therme Skin Care

Ages as of 1 January 2005.

Top Girls Fassa Bortolo Hausbrandt Caffe

Univega Pro Cycling Team

Ages as of 1 January 2005.

Van Bemmelen–AA Drink

Vitron Wilstra Lorini

Ages as of 1 January 2005.

Vlaanderen–Capri Sonne–T Interim

Vrienden van het Platteland

Ages as of 1 January 2005.

References

2005 in women's road cycling
2005